Martin Joe Laurello (born Martin Emmerling, 1885-1955), also known by the stage names Human Owl and Bobby the Boy with the Revolving Head, was a German-American sideshow performer and biological rarity who could turn his head 180 degrees to the rear. He performed with groups such as Ripley's Believe it or Not, Ringling Brothers, and Barnum & Bailey.

Early life and career
Laurello was born Martin Emmerling in Germany circa 1886. In 1921, together with a handful of other people with biological rarities from Europe, Laurello arrived in the United States. Laurello could turn his head 120 degrees. In the words of fellow sideshow performer Percilla Berjano, known as the "Monkey Girl", "[Laurello] could put his head all the way around". To accomplish this feat, he reportedly practised rotating his head for three years and also had to "dislocate various vertebrae". Being born with a slightly bent spine might have also aided Laurello in pulling off his act of flexibility.

For a period of time, Laurello was billed at the Bailey Circus as "Bobby the Boy with the Revolving Head". Laurello also worked at the New York City-based Hubert's Museum, mostly during the winter, as well as Ringling Brothers and Coney Island.  During his stint at the Ripley's Believe It or Not! Odditoriums in the 1930s, Laurello managed to attract massive crowds. When performing, Laurello preferred to don a white shirt. He also trained dogs and cats to do acrobatic tricks.

Personal life
There is not much documented about Laurello's personal life. He was in two different marriages; his first one being Laura [Prechtl] Emmerling (born 1885), and they had one son, named Alexander Emmerling (1905-1960). After their divorce, he then met and married a woman named Emilie [Wittl] Emmerling (1895-1977), and they had two sons together: Albert (1922-1945) and Walter Emmerling (1926-1983).

Berjano described Laurello as "perhaps a Nazi" who "didn't like the American flag". On April 30, 1931, Laurello was arrested by Baltimore police during a tent-packed performance for abandoning his spouse and two sons, after she lodged a complaint via telegram. He was reportedly found standing on a platform with his back and face looking towards the crowd, and when the two officers confronted him, he turned his head around and winked at them both, then was placed under arrest.

References
 

1880s births
Year of birth uncertain
1955 deaths
German entertainers
Sideshow performers
Ringling Bros. and Barnum & Bailey Circus
German emigrants to the United States